"The Wash" is a collaborative single by American rappers Dr. Dre and Snoop Dogg, recorded for and released as the second and final single from The Wash soundtrack. The song was produced by Dr. Dre and DJ Pooh. The song makes many references towards the lyrics in one of Dr. Dre's biggest hits, "Nuthin' but a "G" Thang". Former Boston Red Sox second basemen Dustin Pedroia used the beginning of the song as his batting music until his retirement. In some territories, the song was a packaged as a double A-side with Bad Intentions, the lead single from The Wash.

Track listing
 CD single
 "The Wash" - 3:20
 "The Next Episode" (Instrumental) - 2:42

 12" vinyl
 "The Wash" (Radio Mix) - 3:20
 "The Wash" (LP Version) - 3:20
 "The Wash" (Instrumental) - 3:20
 "The Wash" (Acapella) - 3:20

Chart

References

2002 singles
Dr. Dre songs
Snoop Dogg songs
Aftermath Entertainment singles
Interscope Records singles
G-funk songs
Songs written by Dr. Dre
Songs written by Snoop Dogg
2001 songs